The Canton of Petit-Bourg is a canton in the Arrondissement of Basse-Terre on the island of Guadeloupe.

Municipalities
Since the French canton reorganisation which came into effect in March 2015, the communes of the canton are:
 Goyave 
 Petit-Bourg (partly)

See also
Cantons of Guadeloupe
Communes of Guadeloupe
Arrondissements of Guadeloupe

References

Cantons of Guadeloupe